Halvor Asphol (born 15 June 1961) is a Norwegian former ski jumper. He placed second in a world-cup event on 6 January 1982.

References

External links

1961 births
Living people
People from Molde
Norwegian male ski jumpers
Sportspeople from Møre og Romsdal